Bice Valerian (born Edvige Maria Valcarenghi, 8 May 1886 – 1969) was an Italian film actress of the silent era. She was the wife of the actor and director Roberto Roberti and the mother of Sergio Leone.

Selected filmography
 The Mystery of St. Martin's Bridge (1913)
 Tower of Terror (1913)
 Indian Vampire (1913)
 The Bandit of Port Avon (1914)
 The Princess of Bedford (1914)
 The Danube Boatman (1914)
 Theodora (1914)
 The Cavalcade of Dreams  (1917)

References

External links

1886 births
1969 deaths
Italian silent film actresses
20th-century Italian actresses
Actresses from Rome
Italian people of Lombard descent
Italian people of Austrian descent